The genus Geranium contains more than 420 plant species, which are also known as cranesbill or hardy geranium (to distinguish them from Pelargonium species).

A

 Geranium aculeolatum
 Geranium aequale
 Geranium aequatoriale
 Geranium affine
 Geranium albanum
 Geranium albicans
 Geranium albidum
 Geranium albiflorum
 Geranium album
 Geranium alonsoi
 Geranium alpicola
 Geranium amatolicum
 Geranium amoenum
 Geranium andicola
 Geranium andringitense
 Geranium angelense
 Geranium angustipetalum
 Geranium antisanae
 Geranium antrorsum
 Geranium apricum
 Geranium arabicum
 Geranium arachnoideum
 Geranium arboreum – Hawai'i red cranesbill, Hawaiian red-flowered geranium
 Geranium ardjunense
 Geranium argenteum – silvery cranesbill
 Geranium argentinum
 Geranium aristatum
 Geranium asiaticum
 Geranium asphodeloides – Turkish rock geranium
 Geranium atlanticum
 Geranium atropurpureum – western purple cranesbill
 Geranium austroapenninum
 Geranium ayacuchense
 Geranium ayavacense
 Geranium azorelloides

B

 Geranium balgooyi
 Geranium bangii
 Geranium baschkyzylsaicum
 Geranium baurianum
 Geranium bellum
 Geranium bequaertii
 Geranium berterianum
 Geranium bicknellii – Bicknell's cranesbill, northern cranesbill
 Geranium biuncinatum
 Geranium bockii
 Geranium bohemicum
 Geranium bolivianum
 Geranium braziliense
 Geranium brutium
 Geranium brycei
 Geranium butuoense

C

 Geranium caeruleatum
 Geranium caespitosum – Pineywoods geranium, purple cluster geranium, tufted geranium
 Geranium caffrum
 Geranium californicum – California cranesbill
 Geranium campanulatum
 Geranium campii
 Geranium canescens
 Geranium canopurpureum
 Geranium × cantabrigiense (G. dalmaticum × G. maccrorrhizum)
 Geranium carmineum
 Geranium carolinianum – Carolina cranesbill, Carolina geranium
 Geranium cataractum
 Geranium caucense
 Geranium cazorlense
 Geranium chamaense
 Geranium chaparense
 Geranium charucanum
 Geranium chelikii
 Geranium chilense
 Geranium chimborazense
 Geranium chinchense
 Geranium chinense
 Geranium christensenianum
 Geranium cinereum – ashy cranesbill
 Geranium clarkei – Clark's geranium
 Geranium clarum
 Geranium collae
 Geranium collinum
 Geranium columbianum
 Geranium columbinum – long-stalked cranesbill
 Geranium comarapense
 Geranium commutatum
 Geranium confertum
 Geranium contortum
 Geranium core-core
 Geranium costaricense
 Geranium crassipes
 Geranium crassiusculum
 Geranium crenatifolium
 Geranium cruceroense
 Geranium cuatrecasasii
 Geranium cuchillense
 Geranium cuneatum – silver geranium, hinahina

D

 Geranium dahuricum
 Geranium dalmaticum – Dalmatian cranesbill
 Geranium davisianum
 Geranium delavayi
 Geranium deltoideum
 Geranium dielsianum
 Geranium diffusum
 Geranium digitatum
 Geranium discolor
 Geranium dissectum – cut-leaved cranesbill, cutleaf geranium
 Geranium divaricatum – spreading cranesbill, fanleaf geranium
 Geranium dolomiticum
 Geranium donianum
 Geranium drakensbergense
 Geranium dregei
 Geranium drummondii
 Geranium duclouxii
 Geranium durangense

E

 Geranium ecuadoriense
 Geranium editum
 Geranium eginense
 Geranium elatum
 Geranium endressii – French cranesbill, Endress' cranesbill
 Geranium erianthum – woolly geranium
 Geranium escalonense
 Geranium exellii
 Geranium exallum

F

 Geranium fallax
 Geranium fargesii
 Geranium farreri
 Geranium favosum
 Geranium ferganense
 Geranium fiebrigianum
 Geranium filipes
 Geranium finitimum
 Geranium flaccidum
 Geranium flanaganii
 Geranium franchetii
 Geranium frigidurbis
 Geranium fuscicaule

G

 Geranium geissei
 Geranium gentryi
 Geranium glaberrimum Boiss. & Heldr.
 Geranium glanduligerum
 Geranium goldmanii
 Geranium gorbizense
 Geranium gracile
 Geranium grandistipulatum
 Geranium graniticola
 Geranium guamanense
 Geranium guatemalense
 Geranium gymnocaulon

H

 Geranium hanaense – Maui geranium
 Geranium harmsii
 Geranium harveyi
 Geranium hattae
 Geranium hayatanum
 Geranium heinrichsae
 Geranium henryi
 Geranium hernandesii
 Geranium herrerae
 Geranium herzogii
 Geranium hillebrandii
 Geranium himalayense – Himalayan cranesbill, lilac cranesbill
 Geranium hintonii
 Geranium hispidissimum
 Geranium holm-nielsenii
 Geranium holosericeum
 Geranium homeanum – Australasian geranium
 Geranium huantense
 Geranium humboldtii
 Geranium humile
 Geranium hyperacrion
 Geranium hystricinum

I

 Geranium ibericum – Caucasian cranesbill, Iberian geranium, Caucasus geranium
 Geranium igualatense
 Geranium imbaburae
 Geranium incanum

J

 Geranium jaekelae
 Geranium jahnii
 Geranium jinchuanense

K

 Geranium kashmirianum
 Geranium kauaiense – Kaua'i geranium
 Geranium kerberi
 Geranium kilimandscharicum
 Geranium killipianum
 Geranium killipii
 Geranium kishtvariense
 Geranium knuthianum
 Geranium knuthii
 Geranium koreanum – Korean cranesbill
 Geranium kotschyi
 Geranium krameri
 Geranium kurdicum

L

 Geranium lacustre
 Geranium lambertii
 Geranium lanuginosum
 Geranium lasiocaulon
 Geranium lasiopus
 Geranium latilobum
 Geranium latum
 Geranium laxicaule
 Geranium lazicum
 Geranium lechleri
 Geranium lentum – Mogollon geranium, Mogollon cranesbill
 Geranium leptodactylon
 Geranium leucanthum
 Geranium libani
 Geranium libanoticum
 Geranium lignosum
 Geranium lilacinum
 Geranium limae
 Geranium × lindavicum (G. argenteum × G. cinereum)
 Geranium linearilobum
 Geranium loxense
 Geranium lozanoi
 Geranium lucidum – shining cranesbill, shining geranium

M

 Geranium macrorrhizum – rock cranesbill, bigroot geranium, Bulgarian geranium, zdravetz
 Geranium macrostylum
 Geranium maculatum – spotted geranium, wild geranium, wood geranium, spotted cranesbill, wild cranesbill, alum bloom, alum root, old maid's nightcap
 Geranium maderense – Madeira cranesbill, giant herb-robert
 Geranium × magnificum – purple cranesbill (G. ibericum × G. platypetalum)
 Geranium magellanicum
 Geranium makmelicum
 Geranium malpapense
 Geranium malviflorum
 Geranium maniculatum
 Geranium mascatense
 Geranium mathewsii
 Geranium matucanense
 Geranium maximowiczii
 Geranium melanopotanicum
 Geranium meridense
 Geranium mexicanum
 Geranium mlanjensis
 Geranium mogotocorense
 Geranium molle – dovefoot cranesbill, awnless geranium, dovefoot geranium
 Geranium mollendiense
 Geranium × monanense – Munich cranesbill (G. phaeum × G. reflexum)
 Geranium monanthum
 Geranium montanum
 Geranium monticola
 Geranium moorei
 Geranium moupinense
 Geranium multiceps
 Geranium multiflorum – Haleakalā geranium, manyflower geranium
 Geranium multipartitum
 Geranium multisectum

N

 Geranium nakaoanum
 Geranium nanum
 Geranium napuligerum
 Geranium natalense
 Geranium neglectum
 Geranium neohispidum
 Geranium neopumilum
 Geranium nepalense
 Geranium nervosum
 Geranium niuginiense
 Geranium nivale
 Geranium niveum
 Geranium nodosum – knotted cranesbill
 Geranium nuristanicum
 Geranium nyassense

O

 Geranium oaxacanum
 Geranium obtusisepalum
 Geranium ochsenii
 Geranium oreganum – Oregon geranium, Oregon cranesbill
 Geranium orientali-tibeticum
 Geranium ornithopodioides
 Geranium ornithopodon
 Geranium × oxonianum Yeo – Druce's cranesbill (G. endressi × G. versicolor)

P

 Geranium paishanense
 Geranium palcaense
 Geranium pallidifolium
 Geranium palmatipartitum
 Geranium palmatum – Canary Island geranium
 Geranium paludosum
 Geranium palustre – marsh cranesbill
 Geranium pamiricum
 Geranium papuanum
 Geranium paramicola
 Geranium parodii
 Geranium patagonicum
 Geranium pavonianum
 Geranium peloponnesiacum
 Geranium persicum
 Geranium peruvianum
 Geranium petri-davisii
 Geranium pflanzii
 Geranium phaeum – dusky cranesbill, mourning widow
 Geranium philippii
 Geranium pichinchense
 Geranium pilgerianum
 Geranium pinetophilum
 Geranium piurense
 Geranium platyanthum
 Geranium platypetalum – broad-petaled geranium
 Geranium platyrenifolium
 Geranium pogonanthum
 Geranium polyanthes
 Geranium ponticum
 Geranium potentillifolium
 Geranium potentilloides – cinquefoil geranium, native carrot (Australia)
 Geranium potosinum
 Geranium pratense – meadow cranesbill
 Geranium pringlei
 Geranium procurrens Yeo
 Geranium pseudofarreri
 Geranium pseudosibiricum
 Geranium psilostemon – Armenian cranesbill
 Geranium pulchrum
 Geranium purpureum Vill. – little robin
 Geranium pusillum – small-flowered cranesbill, small geranium
 Geranium pylzowianum
 Geranium pyrenaicum Burm.f. – hedgerow cranesbill, hedgerow geranium

R

 Geranium raimondii
 Geranium rapulum
 Geranium rectum
 Geranium reflexum – reflexed cranesbill
 Geranium refractum
 Geranium regelii
 Geranium reinii
 Geranium renardii
 Geranium renifolium
 Geranium repens
 Geranium reptans
 Geranium retectum
 Geranium retrorsum – common cranesbill, New Zealand geranium
 Geranium reuteri – giant geranium
 Geranium rhomboidale
 Geranium richardsonii – Richardson's geranium
 Geranium rivulare
 Geranium robertianum – herb robert, robert geranium
 Geranium robustipes
 Geranium robustum
 Geranium rosthornii
 Geranium rotundifolium – round-leaved cranesbill, roundleaf geranium
 Geranium rubescens – greater herb-robert
 Geranium rubifolium
 Geranium ruizii
 Geranium rupicola
 Geranium ruprechtii

S

 Geranium sanguineum L. – bloody cranesbill, bloody geranium
 Geranium santacruzense
 Geranium santanderiense
 Geranium saxatile
 Geranium schiedeanum
 Geranium schimpffii
 Geranium schlechteri
 Geranium schultzei
 Geranium scissum
 Geranium scullyi
 Geranium sebosum
 Geranium seemannii
 Geranium selloi
 Geranium sepalo-roseum
 Geranium sericeum
 Geranium sessiliflorum
 Geranium shensianum
 Geranium shikokianum
 Geranium siamense
 Geranium sibbaldioides
 Geranium sibiricum – Siberian geranium
 Geranium sinense
 Geranium skottsbergii
 Geranium smithianum
 Geranium soboliferum
 Geranium sodiroanum
 Geranium solanderi – Solander's geranium
 Geranium solitarium
 Geranium sophiae
 Geranium soratae
 Geranium sparsiflorum
 Geranium squamosum
 Geranium staffordianum
 Geranium stapfianum
 Geranium stoloniferum
 Geranium stramineum
 Geranium strictipes
 Geranium stuebelii
 Geranium subacutum
 Geranium subargenteum
 Geranium subcaulescens
 Geranium subcompositum
 Geranium subglabrum
 Geranium sublaevispermum
 Geranium subnudicaule
 Geranium subscandens
 Geranium subsericeum
 Geranium subulato-stipulatum
 Geranium subumbelliforme
 Geranium superbum
 Geranium suzukii
 Geranium swatense
 Geranium sylvaticum – wood cranesbill, woodland geranium

T

 Geranium tafiense
 Geranium tanii
 Geranium texanum – Texas geranium
 Geranium thessalum
 Geranium thunbergii – Thunberg's geranium
 Geranium tiguense
 Geranium totorense
 Geranium tracyi
 Geranium transbaicalicum
 Geranium traversii
 Geranium trianae
 Geranium trilophum
 Geranium tripartitum
 Geranium trolliifolium
 Geranium tuberaria
 Geranium tuberosum – tuberous cranesbill

U

 Geranium umbelliforme
 Geranium unguiculatum
 Geranium uralense

V

 Geranium vagans
 Geranium venezuelae
 Geranium venturianum
 Geranium versicolor – pencilled cranesbill, veiny geranium
 Geranium viscosissimum – sticky purple geranium
 Geranium vulcanicola

W

 Geranium wakkerstroomianum
 Geranium wallichianum
 Geranium wardii
 Geranium weberbauerianum
 Geranium weddellii
 Geranium whartonianum
 Geranium wilfordii
 Geranium wilhelminae
 Geranium wislizeni – Huachuca geranium, Huachuca Mountain geranium
 Geranium wlassovianum

Y

 Geranium yaanense
 Geranium yeoi
 Geranium yesoense
 Geranium yoshinoi
 Geranium yuexiense
 Geranium yunnanense

References 

 GBIF list of Geranium species

Geranium